Bothkamper See is a lake in Schleswig-Holstein, Germany. At an elevation of 25 m, its surface area is 1.36 km².

Lakes of Schleswig-Holstein
LBothkamperSee